was the seventh studio album released by the Japanese rock band The Blue Hearts and the eighth album released overall.

Tracks
"Tegami" (手紙 Letter)
"Midori no Happa" (緑のハッパ Green Leaf)
"Torch Song" (トーチソング Tōchi Songu)
"Ame Agari" (雨上がり After the Rain)
"Toshi o Torō" (年をとろう Get Older)
"Yoru no Tōzokudan" (夜の盗賊団 Night Thieves)
"King of Rookie" (キング・オブ・ルーキー Kingu obu Rūkii)
"Muchi to Manto" (ムチとマント Whip and Cloak)
"Takaramono" (宝もの Treasures)
"Yūgure" (夕暮れ Twilight)
"Party" (パーティー Paatii)
"Chance" (チャンス Chansu)

References

The Blue Hearts albums
1993 albums